St. John Vianney High School (a.k.a. Vianney High School, or simply Vianney) is a private, all-male Catholic college preparatory school in Kirkwood, Missouri. The school was opened in 1960 by the Society of Mary (Marianists), a religious order of priests and brothers who continue to run the school, and is part of the Roman Catholic Archdiocese of Saint Louis, along with the Marianists' Chaminade College Preparatory School and St. Mary's High School.

History
St. John Vianney High School has graduated a class every year since it opened. 

In 1999, Vianney received an award from the federal government's Blue Ribbon Schools Program. 

Vianney has built new classrooms, gymnasium, library, science labs, and turf football and baseball fields.

Athletics

Vianney sponsors athletic teams in football, soccer, cross country, basketball, swimming, wrestling, baseball, golf, tennis, track and field, volleyball.  There are also club teams for outdoor lacrosse, bowling, chess, lacrosse, racquetball and ice hockey.

In 2011 and 2013, the Varsity Chess Team won the National Championships.

Vianney is a member of the Metro Catholic Conference of private Catholic high schools, along with: 
De Smet Jesuit High School
Christian Brothers College High School
Chaminade College Preparatory School
St. Louis University High School

State championships

 Baseball – 2004, 2006, 2018
 Football – 2016, 2018
 Hockey – 1979, 1996, 2020
 Soccer – 1978, 1980, 1981, 1982, 1987, 1991, 1992
 Volleyball – 1989, 1991, 1992, 1994, 1995, 1997, 1998, 1999, 2000, 2001, 2002, 2004, 2005, 2006, 2010, 2011, 2013

National championships

 Chess – 2011, 2013
 Soccer – 1992

School mascot

The school mascot is the Golden Griffin: half lion and half eagle. The school colors, black and gold, reflect the colors of the Griffin. The school states that the Griffin represents certain virtues in all of its students.

School fight song

The St. John Vianney High School fight song, written by former guidance counselor Brother Harold Lootens. is often sung at football and basketball games and at pep rallies: "We are the black and gold of Vianney. We are the Golden Griffins of Vianney High. Half Lion, half Eagle, so the Griffin can roar, so the Griffin can soar above the lightning and the thunder. We will win, win, win, yeah Vianney. Oh hear the din, din, din, of our clamor and cheers. We want the world to be told about the black and the gold of old Vianney, Vianney, Vianney, Hey!"

Controversy
In 2006, Vianney President Fr. Robert Osborne (1933-2014) was accused in a civil lawsuit of sexual misconduct with a student. Osborne stepped down temporarily, then the school fired him after another accuser stepped forward. The school later settled the lawsuit for an undisclosed amount. Osborne was investigated by the Kirkwood Police but not charged with a crime. A subsequent Marianist investigation found "no credible or substantiated allegation of abuse", but the following year, the order stripped him of his priestly faculties.

Notable alumni

Sports and entertainment
Matt Cepicky: MLB player (Montreal Expos, Florida Marlins)
Scott Cepicky: Minor League Baseball player (Chicago White Sox) and Republican politician
Tim Dunigan: actor
Neil Fiala: MLB player (St. Louis Cardinals, Cincinnati Reds)
Trent Green: NFL quarterback
Mark Lamping: president, St. Louis Cardinals Major League Baseball Club (2006 World Champions)
Kyle Markway: Cleveland Browns tight end
Dan McLaughlin: St. Louis Cardinals radio and television broadcaster
Tom Mullen: NFL offensive lineman
Cliff Politte: Major League Baseball pitcher
Nick Schmidt: Major League Baseball pitcher
Riley Schmidt: actor, American horror story
Mark Segbers: soccer player
Scott Touzinsky: US Volleyball Olympian, outside hitter, 2008 Beijing Games gold medalist
Erik Ustruck: midfielder, Houston Dynamo
Kyren Williams: American football running back, Los Angeles Rams
Tony Williams: soccer player

Arts and sciences
Bob Cassilly: founder of St. Louis City Museum
Michael Wendl: Human Genome Project scientist
Donald K. Anton: professor

Law and government
Scott Cepicky: Tennessee House of Representatives

Notable faculty
John Hamman
Steve Bieser
Cole McNary

See also
Kirkwood, Missouri
Society of Mary (Marianists)

References 

Roman Catholic secondary schools in St. Louis County, Missouri
Marianist schools
Educational institutions established in 1960
Boys' schools in Missouri
1960 establishments in Missouri
Roman Catholic Archdiocese of St. Louis